Anthony Johnson (born January 29, 1995) is an American football wide receiver for the Hamilton Tiger-Cats of the Canadian Football League (CFL). He played college football at Buffalo. He has also been a member of the Tampa Bay Buccaneers, Los Angeles Chargers and Pittsburgh Steelers.

Early years and college career
Johnson attended South Pointe High School in Rock Hill, South Carolina. He attended Butler Community College in 2014 and Iowa Western Community College in 2015. He transferred to the University at Buffalo in 2016 and redshirted his first year. In 2017, he started all 12 games and had 76 receptions for 1,356 yards and a school record 14 touchdowns. In 2018, he started all 13 games and had 57 receptions for 1,011 yards and 11 touchdowns.

Professional career

Tampa Bay Buccaneers
Johnson signed with the Tampa Bay Buccaneers as an undrafted free agent following the 2019 NFL Draft. He was one of five undrafted free agents from Buffalo to sign with teams after the draft, including quarterback Tyree Jackson. He was waived during final roster cuts on August 30, 2019.

Los Angeles Chargers
On September 11, 2019, Johnson was signed to the Los Angeles Chargers practice squad. His practice squad contract with the team expired on January 6, 2020.

Pittsburgh Steelers
On January 8, 2020, Johnson signed a reserve/future contract with the Pittsburgh Steelers. He was waived/injured on August 27, 2020, and subsequently reverted to the team's injured reserve list the next day. He was waived with an injury settlement on September 4, 2020. The Steelers signed Johnson to their practice squad on October 26, 2020. On January 14, 2021, Johnson signed a reserve/futures contract with the Steelers. He was waived on August 28, 2021.

Hamilton Tiger-Cats 
On April 20, 2022 it was announced that Johnson had signed with the Hamilton Tiger-Cats of the Canadian Football League (CFL).

References

External links
CFL profile
Pittsburgh Steelers bio
Buffalo Bulls bio

1995 births
Living people
People from Rock Hill, South Carolina
Players of American football from South Carolina
American football wide receivers
Butler Grizzlies football players
Iowa Western Reivers football players
Buffalo Bulls football players
Tampa Bay Buccaneers players
Los Angeles Chargers players
Pittsburgh Steelers players
Players of Canadian football from South Carolina
Hamilton Tiger-Cats players